Realitatea TV (meaning "The Reality TV") is the former name of the Romanian news television channel Realitatea Plus. The channel began broadcasting in 2001 as a general-profile television and became the first Romanian news television in 2002. Its owners are Romanian politician Cozmin Guşă and businessman Maricel Păcuraru.

After becoming insolvent in 2011 and bankruptcy in 2019, the channel lost its license on 31 October 2019. The channel began broadcasting on 1 November 2019, including advertising, on Realitatea Plus, a channel that was launched in 2015 on satellite for the public outside Romania. Realitatea Plus has a slightly modified version of the previous logo of Realitatea TV.

History 

Realitatea TV started broadcasting in 2001, as a general-profile TV station. However, it began broadcasting hourly newscasts and soon changed its format, becoming the first news television in Romania. Prigoană brought Ion Cristoiu to supervise the channel and rise its audience.

In 2004, Silviu Prigoană sold the network to an Italian company that later sold it to Petrom, which subsequently lost it to Sorin Ovidiu Vântu, sometime in 2006. Vântu was occasionally accused of using his television to manipulate public opinion against President Băsescu and his party. After the channel went into insolvency in 2011, Vântu sold it to businessman Elan Schwarzenberg, while the management of the media group was under the control of Sebastian Ghiță.

In 2013, the channel was bought by Cozmin Guşă and Maricel Păcuraru.

References

External links 
 Official Site

Defunct television channels in Romania
Television channels and stations established in 2001
24-hour television news channels in Romania
Romanian news websites
Television channels and stations disestablished in 2019